The New York Review Books Children's Collection is a series of children's books released under the publishing imprint New York Review Books. The series was founded in 2003 to reintroduce some of the many children's books that have fallen out of print, or simply out of mainstream attention. The series includes more than 80 titles, ranging from picture books to young adult novels.  Often reissued with new introductions, writers such as Michael Chabon, Neil Gaiman, and Philip Pullman have all introduced titles in this series.

The titles include the Caldecott Medal-winning picture book D'Aulaires' Book of Norse Myths; the Newbery Honor Book Pecos Bill; Wee Gillis, a Caldecott Honor Book; the 1944 winner of the Carnegie Medal, The Wind on the Moon; Esther Averill's Jenny and the Cat Club series; The House of Arden; The 13 Clocks; The Wonderful O; The Peterkin Papers; and holiday favorites The Midnight Folk and The Box of Delights.

Titles In Series
Alfred Ollivant's Bob, Son of Battle by Alfred Ollivant
Alphabetabum by Vladimir Radunsky and Chris Raschka
Arthur by Rhoda Levine
Beyond the PawPaw Trees by Palmer Brown
The Bear and the People by Reiner Zimnik
The Bears' Famous Invasion of Sicily by Dino Buzzati
Bel Ria: Dog of War by Sheila Burnford
The Box of Delights by John Masefield
Captains of the City Streets by Esther Averill
Carbonel: The King of Cats by Barbara Sleigh
Carbonel & Calidor by Barbara Sleigh
Catlantis by Anna Starobinets
Charlotte Sometimes by Penelope Farmer
Cheerful by Palmer Brown
The Complete Polly and the Wolf by Catherine Storr
The Crane by Reiner Zimnik
D'Aulaires' Book of Animals by Ingri and Edgar Parin d'Aulaire
D'Aulaires' Book of Norse Myths by Ingri and Edgar Parin d'Aulaire
D'Aulaires' Book of Trolls by Ingri and Edgar Parin d'Aulaire
Donkey-Donkey by Roger Duvoisin
An Episode of Sparrows by Rumer Godden
Fletcher and Zenobia by Victoria Chess and Edward Gorey
Foxie: The Singing Dog by Ingri and Edgar Parin d'Aulaire
Harrison Loved His Umbrella by Rhoda Levine
The Hotel Cat by Esther Averill
The House of Arden by E. Nesbit
The Island of Horses by Eilís Dillon
Jenny and the Cat Club by Esther Averill
Jenny Goes to Sea by Esther Averill
Jenny's Birthday Book by Esther Averill
Jenny's Moonlight Adventure by Esther Averill
The Little Bookroom by Eleanor Farjeon
The Lost Island by Eilís Dillon
The Magic Pudding by Norman Lindsay
The Marzipan Pig by Russell Hoban
The Midnight Folk by John Masefield
Mistress Masham's Repose by T.H. White
Mouse House by Rumer Godden
Pecos Bill by James Cloyd Bowman
The Peterkin Papers by Lucretia P. Hale
The School for Cats by Esther Averill
The 13 Clocks  by James Thurber
The Two Cars by  Ingri and Edgar Parin d'Aulaire
The Wind on the Moon by Eric Linklater
Three Ladies Beside the Sea by Rhoda Levine
Too Big by Ingri and Edgar Parin d'Aulaire
Uncle by J. P. Martin
Uncle Cleans Up by J. P. Martin
Wee Gillis by Munro Leaf
The Wind on the Moon by Eric Linklater
Wolf Story by William McCleery
The Wonderful O  by James Thurber

References

External links
 

https://www.nytimes.com/column/childrens-books

Book publishing companies based in New York (state)